Michael John Cloete Crawford Rutherford (born 2 October 1950) is an English guitarist, bassist and songwriter, co-founder of the rock band Genesis. Rutherford and keyboardist Tony Banks are the group's two continuous members.

Initially serving as Genesis's bass guitarist and backing vocalist, Rutherford also performed most of the band's rhythm guitar parts—frequently on twelve-string guitar—in collaboration with successive Genesis lead guitarists Anthony Phillips and Steve Hackett. Following Hackett's departure from Genesis in 1977, Rutherford assumed the additional role of lead guitarist on the band's studio albums (beginning with ...And Then There Were Three... in 1978). Rutherford was one of the main Genesis songwriters throughout their career and also wrote the lyrics for some of the band's biggest international hits, such as "Follow You Follow Me", "Turn It On Again", "Land of Confusion" and "Throwing It All Away". He was inducted into the Rock and Roll Hall of Fame as a member of Genesis in 2010.

In addition to his work with Genesis, Rutherford released two solo albums in the early 1980s. In 1985, he formed Mike + the Mechanics, which became a chart-topping act and significant live draw in its own right. The group earned Rutherford an Ivor Novello Award for the 1988 single "The Living Years", as well as two Grammys.

Early life
Michael John Cloete Crawford Rutherford was born on 2 October 1950 in Chertsey, Surrey. His father, William Rutherford, was a Royal Navy Captain who became a manager in industry upon his retirement from the service and married his mother Anne. He has an elder sister, Nicolette.

Rutherford received his first guitar at the age of 8, and played in his first band, The Chesters, named because by then they lived near Chester, in the following year. He attended The Leas, a preparatory school in Hoylake, Merseyside before he moved to Charterhouse, a private school in Godalming, Surrey in September 1964. He co-formed the school band Anon with guitarist Anthony Phillips in 1965, after which they split and formed Genesis in 1967 with fellow Charterhouse pupils, keyboardist Tony Banks, vocalist Peter Gabriel, and Chris Stewart. Rutherford disliked his time at Charterhouse, and was expelled for instances of minor misconduct.

Playing style
Rutherford's playing style has been shaped by his unorthodox performance requirements within Genesis, which from a fairly early date required frequent shifts between instruments (or shifts of role between instruments). Though his work with bass and guitar has been praised by some critics, he has described his playing as average and said that he considers himself a songwriter first and foremost.

Rutherford's bass guitar playing initially involved the use of a pick and a high-treble setting. He would also sometimes employ a relatively harsh, horn-like distortion setting to differentiate the instrument's tone from the rest of the ensemble. In the mid-1970s he would begin to play fretless bass guitar on Genesis songs (in particular on ballads) and would experiment with 8-string bass guitar.

Rutherford's rhythm guitar playing was initially characterised by his use of electric and acoustic 12-string guitars. A distinctive sound of early Genesis recordings was Rutherford's double acoustic 12-string playing intertwined with that of Anthony Phillips or, later, Steve Hackett (keyboard player Tony Banks would occasionally also play 12-string guitar parts to make up a duo or trio). As a rhythm guitar player and writer, Rutherford has favoured melodic, minimalist chords or progressions of single notes, as in Genesis songs "Follow You Follow Me", "Turn It On Again" and "Invisible Touch", or the Mike and the Mechanics song "The Living Years".

Rutherford assumed lead guitar duties for Genesis in 1977. Previously he had made occasional lead guitar contributions to Genesis music if they were best played by him (such as the electric sitar parts on Selling England by the Pound), but following the departure of Hackett and the band's decision not to replace him with a new guitarist, despite toying with auditioning new guitarists or using a studio guitarist on ...And Then There Were Three..., Rutherford assumed all guitarist roles in the recording studio, having felt confident enough to double up on lead guitar as well as bass. As a lead player he has favoured long, melodic tones, bending the notes into plaintive, almost vocal lines. This results in "singable" solos or the creation of sonic atmospheres rather than showy displays of technical prowess. Post-Hackett, he has also diversified his rhythm guitar approach beyond his initial twelve-string-based approach.

From an early date, Rutherford also played bass pedals both live and in the studio, often playing simultaneous twelve-string guitar and bass pedal parts in order to cover rhythm and bass parts at the same time. Initially using a Dewtron "Mister Bassman" bass pedal synthesiser, he had moved onto Moog Taurus bass pedals by the 1976 Trick of the Tail Tour. Frequently Rutherford's bass guitar, 12-string guitar, and bass pedal playing have featured in different sections of a single Genesis song, "Supper's Ready", "Firth of Fifth" and "The Cinema Show" being good examples of this. Sometimes Rutherford's bass pedals are used to set up a steady drone as the basis for an individual song (such as "Afterglow").

In concerts during the first half of the 1970s, Rutherford often played a double-necked instrument, custom built from a separate Rickenbacker hollowbody 12-string and 4001 bass. Rickenbacker later issued double neck bass/guitar combinations with 4080/6 and 4080/12 models. However, Rutherford assigned the guitar neck to the top position rather than the 4080's stock guitar on bottom. He later had a custom Shergold double-neck made, with the body modified so that each neck could be detached and played as a standard single-neck instrument, or swapped out in favour of alternate halves (allowing the 12-string half to be switched to a 6-string when needed). On post-1977 Genesis live shows, Rutherford would alternate parts with touring band member Daryl Stuermer. Stuermer would typically play all of Hackett's original guitar parts (while Rutherford concentrated on bass, twelve-string guitar and pedals), but play bass guitar on most songs from the post-Hackett era (for which Rutherford would move to guitar).

Rutherford also contributed other instrumental work to Genesis, performing occasional cello parts on their early 1970s records and playing the drumkit on live performances of the song "Who Dunnit?" in 1981.

Solo work and Mike + the Mechanics
During breaks in Genesis, Rutherford recorded two solo albums, Smallcreep's Day and Acting Very Strange. However, he was dissatisfied with his solo work and in 1984 he resolved to never record a solo album again, since he felt his creativity was at its peak when working in collaboration. Because of this, he formed the band Mike + The Mechanics during a break from Genesis in 1985.

Mike + The Mechanics' biggest hits are "All I Need Is a Miracle", "Word of Mouth", "The Living Years", "Silent Running" and "Over My Shoulder". To help promote "The Living Years", Rutherford and the record label perpetuated the impression that the song was inspired by Rutherford's relationship with his father, who died during Genesis's Invisible Touch Tour. In 2004, Rutherford confessed that the lyrics were in fact written by B. A. Robertson, and based entirely on Robertson's relationship with his father.

Rutherford also collaborated with other artists, including associates Peter Gabriel and Phil Collins, on the Against All Odds soundtrack, offering the song "Making A Big Mistake".

Rutherford played at the Strat Pack Concert in 2004 along with Brian May, David Gilmour, Joe Walsh and many other guitarists, in a celebration of the 50th anniversary of the Fender Stratocaster electric guitar. Rutherford performed in the closing ceremony of the 2012 Summer Olympics on 12 August 2012 as a guest member of Ed Sheeran's band along with Pink Floyd drummer Nick Mason, playing the Pink Floyd song "Wish You Were Here".

Instruments

Early in his career, Rutherford played mainly Rickenbacker and Shergold basses. He developed the idea behind the M-Series Steinberger guitar with the help of English luthier Roger Giffin and he used this extensively in the 1980s and during The Invisible Touch Tour with Genesis. He had a double-neck Strata (later renamed Status) built for the Mama tour which featured a six string guitar and four string bass placed in a custom body. In the earlier years of Genesis he played a Dewtron Mister Bassman and, starting in 1976, Moog Taurus bass pedal synthesisers.

Through the early 1970s live tours, Rutherford often used a custom built Rickenbacker double-neck that combined a 12-string semi-hollow-body guitar with a 4-string bass (now on display at the Rock and Roll Hall of Fame Museum). For The Lamb Lies Down on Broadway and the first part of the Trick of the Tail tours, he incorporated a Rickenbacker 12-string solid-body guitar and a 6-string Micro-Frets Signature Baritone, equipped with 6-string short scale bass strings. Later he switched to another 12-string solid body/6-string bass combination built from scratch. All these double-neck guitars were made by luthier Dick Knight. A custom Shergold double-neck was made that had modules for 4, 6 and 12 strings guitars. The retunings required for early Genesis songs led to the development of Peter Gabriel's stories and introductions.

For the 2007 tour with Genesis, Rutherford continued to use double-neck instruments when the arrangements demand quick switches between bass and twelve-string guitars. His current double-neck model is a Gibson twelve-string guitar with a Yamaha TRB-4P bass while he prefers Eric Clapton signature model Fender Stratocasters when playing guitar on later pieces. As for bass, from 1992 on, Rutherford can be seen playing mostly Yamaha from the TRB series. During the 2022 The Last Domino? Tour, Rutherford started using Squier Bullet Stratocasters after purchasing a pair while under lockdown in Cape Town.

Personal life
Rutherford currently divides his time between Loxwood, West Sussex, England, and Cape Town, South Africa with his wife Angie. The couple were married on 13 November 1976 and have three children: Kate (b. 1977), Tom (b. 1980), and Harry (b. 1986). The family enjoys equestrian sport such as polo and dressage, in addition to raising horses.

In 2009, Philip Beresford, compiler of the Sunday Times Rich List, estimated Rutherford's fortune at £30 million from past touring activity, future touring income, and the Genesis back catalogue, plus other smaller company assets and accumulated earnings.

Memoir
In 2014, Rutherford published The Living Years: The First Genesis Memoir with Thomas Dunne Books. The first book about Rutherford's solo career, called Silent Runner by journalist Mario Giammetti, was published in Italy (Edizioni Segno) in 2011.

Discography

Genesis

Mike + The Mechanics

Solo albums

Solo singles

References

Biography

External links

 Article about Mike Rutherford's Shergold double neck guitar
 World of Genesis.com Mike Rutherford Biography
 World of Genesis.com 2004 Mike Rutherford Interview: Genesis of a Mechanic
 "Mike Rutherford joins the Band du Lac – charity concert 11 June 2005

1950 births
Living people
Atlantic Records artists
Charisma Records artists
English rock bass guitarists
English rock guitarists
English songwriters
Genesis (band) members
Lead guitarists
Male bass guitarists
Mike + The Mechanics members
People educated at Charterhouse School
People from Surrey
Progressive rock guitarists
Progressive rock bass guitarists
Rhythm guitarists